Rike Boomgaarden is a German singer and songwriter. She has written songs for many European and Japanese pop stars including Namie Amuro, Jolin Tsai, and Sarah Connor.

Biography 
Rike Boomgaarden began singing at age five and subsequently started learning to play various instruments. In her late teens, she started touring around Europe with several cover bands to gain exposure. During the intermittent breaks in her touring schedule, she began  "demo singing" for various songwriting pitches. This eventually lead to her becoming a ghost singer for various major label projects throughout Europe.

Boomgaarden started crafting her own records for pitch with fellow songwriter Alex Geringas. Through these co-writings Rike was able to secure a publishing deal with Universal Music Publishing Group in 2010. Since 2010 she has written songs for Namie Amuro, Jolin Tsai, Sarah Connor (singer), BoA, Lidia Kopania, and Natalia.

Discography

References

German songwriters
Living people
Year of birth missing (living people)